Luisa Regina Cachan Muñoz (born January 21, 1979) is an S4 swimmer from Spain.  She has a disability where she cannot use her legs and can only use some of her arms and hands.

Born in Aviles, Muñoz competed at the 1992 Summer Paralympics, 1996 Summer Paralympics and 2000 Summer Paralympics, where she did not medal. She competed at the 2004 Summer Paralympics, where she earned a silver medal in the 4 x 50 meter 20pts relay.

References 

Living people
1979 births
Spanish female backstroke swimmers
Spanish female breaststroke swimmers
Spanish female butterfly swimmers
Spanish female freestyle swimmers
Spanish female medley swimmers
Swimmers at the 1992 Summer Paralympics
Swimmers at the 1996 Summer Paralympics
Swimmers at the 2000 Summer Paralympics
Swimmers at the 2004 Summer Paralympics
Paralympic silver medalists for Spain
Paralympic medalists in swimming
Medalists at the 1992 Summer Paralympics
Medalists at the 2004 Summer Paralympics
Paralympic swimmers of Spain
S4-classified Paralympic swimmers
Medalists at the World Para Swimming Championships
20th-century Spanish women
21st-century Spanish women